Senator Gillett may refer to:

Frederick H. Gillett (1851–1935), Massachusetts State Senate
James Gillett (1860–1937), California State Senate

See also
Senator Gillette (disambiguation)